The Godefroy River (in French: rivière Godefroy) is a tributary of the south shore of the St. Lawrence River. This watercourse flows in the town of Bécancour, in Bécancour Regional County Municipality, in the administrative region of Centre-du-Québec, in Quebec, in Canada.

Geography 

The main neighboring watersheds of the Godefroy river are:
 North side: St. Lawrence River
 East side: Bécancour River
 South side: Blanche River
 West side: Arsenault stream

Lake Saint-Paul constitutes the source of the Godefroy River. This body of water is located very close (on the east side) of the intersection of highways 55 and 30, or south of the Laviolette bridge spanning the St. Lawrence River.

Toponymy 
The toponym Godefroy River was formalized on December 5, 1968, at the Commission de toponymie du Québec.

See also 
 List of rivers of Quebec

References 

Rivers of Centre-du-Québec